This is a list of notable events in Latin music (music from the Spanish- and Portuguese-speaking areas of Latin America, Latin Europe, and the United States) that took place in 1988.

Events 
March 2The 30th Annual Grammy Awards are held at The Radio City Music Hall in New York City:
Julio Iglesias wins the Grammy Award for Best Latin Pop Performance for Un Hombre Solo.
Los Tigres del Norte wins the Grammy Award for Best Mexican/Mexican-American Performance for Gracias!... América... Sin Fronteras.
Eddie Palmieri wins the Grammy Award for Best Tropical Latin Performance for La Verdad/The Truth.

Bands formed

Bands reformed

Bands disbanded

Bands on hiatus

Number-ones albums and singles by country 
List of number-one albums of 1988 (Spain)
List of number-one singles of 1988 (Spain)
List of number-one Billboard Latin Pop Albums of 1988
List of number-one Billboard Regional Mexican Albums of 1988
List of number-one Billboard Tropical Albums of 1988
List of number-one Billboard Top Latin Songs of 1988

Awards 
1988 Tejano Music Awards

Albums released

First quarter

January

February

March

April

Second quarter

May

June

July

August

September

Fourth quarter

October

November

Dates unknown

Best-selling records

Best-selling albums
The following is a list of the top 5 best-selling Latin albums of 1988 in the United States divided into the categories of Latin pop, Regional Mexican, and Tropical/salsa, according to Billboard.

Best-performing songs
The following is a list of the top 10 best-performing Latin songs in the United States in 1988, according to Billboard.

Births

Deaths

References 

 
Latin music by year